Baleyran (also Romanized as Baleyrān) known as Baliran is a village in Dasht-e Sar Rural District, Dabudasht District, Amol County, Mazandaran Province, Iran. At the 2006 census, its population was 101, in 25 families.

Gallery

References 

Populated places in Amol County
Tourist attractions in Amol